Aminul Islam Danesh Mia (1919–2006) was a Bangladesh Awami League politician and the former Member of Parliament of Faridpur-15.

Early life 
Mia was born on 20 October 1919 in Kabirajkandi village, Shariatpur District, East Bengal, British India.

Career 
Mia was elected to parliament from Faridpur-15 as a Bangladesh Awami League candidate in 1973. He was a member of the Constituent Assembly of Bangladesh.

Death 
Mia died on 23 January 2006.

References 

Awami League politicians
1919 births
2006 deaths
1st Jatiya Sangsad members